is a metro station on the  Osaka Metro Chūō Line and Nankō Port Town Line (New Tram) in Suminoe-ku, Osaka, Japan. This station serves as the starting terminus of both lines. This station, which services the Cosmosquare Complex, is the westernmost station of the Osaka subway system.

Lines

 (Station Number: C10)
 (Station Number: P09)

History
 The station opened to rail traffic on December 18, 1997, on the Osaka Port Transport System Techno Port Line.
 On July 1, 2005, Osaka Municipal Transportation Bureau took over management of the station; Osaka Metro would take over management of the station on April 1, 2018.
 A mini aquarium was installed on the subway platform at one time. Due to excessive maintenance costs and the relatively few users of the station, it was removed.
 A different train approach melody was used on the station, playing a sound similar to that of an ocean wave.  On March 27, 2007, the melody was changed to the standard approach melody that is used on the metro.

Layout

External links
 Cosmosquare Station

Railway stations in Osaka Prefecture
Osaka Metro stations
Railway stations in Japan opened in 1997